Aitor González Luna (born 18 September 1981), professionally known as Aitor Luna, is a Spanish actor. He earned early public recognition in Spain for his performance in Los hombres de Paco. He has since featured in series such as Gran Reserva, Las aventuras del capitán Alatriste or Cathedral of the Sea.

Biography 
Born on 18 September 1981 in Bergara, Gipuzkoa, son to Andalusian migrants in the Basque Country, he is the older brother of actor Yon González. Luna trained his acting chops at Ánima Eskola. He made his television debut in 2005 in the Basque soap opera Goenkale. He earned early public recognition in Spain for his performance from 2005 to 2009 as Gonzalo Montoya in Los hombres de Paco. In 2014, he landed the lead of the television adaptation of the Arturo Pérez Reverte's Capitán Alatriste novels, Las aventuras del capitán Alatriste, which proved to be an audience blunder. Among other performances, he has since featured in the final season of Velvet, as the lead of the historical drama series Cathedral of the Sea and in the Telemundo telenovela Enemigo íntimo.

Filmography 

Television

Film

Accolades

References 

1981 births
Spanish male television actors
Spanish male film actors
21st-century Spanish male actors
People from Bergara
Living people
Ánima Eskola School of Drama alumni